Pennsylvania College of Technology (Penn College) is a public college in Williamsport, Pennsylvania. It is affiliated with, but a self-governing entity of, Pennsylvania State University. As an applied technology college (known by the locals and alumni alike as "Penn Tech", for decades) the school offers certificate, associate, baccalaureate, and master's degree programs in more than 100 fields of study. The college's student body is 64% male and 86% are full-time.

Pennsylvania College of Technology is broken down into three schools of study; School of Business, Arts & Sciences, School of Engineering Technologies and School of Nursing & Health Sciences.

The college's athletic teams play under the school's nickname the Penn College Wildcats. Penn College yields 15 varsity sports teams which compete in National Collegiate Athletic Association (NCAA) Division III in the North Eastern Athletic Conference (NEAC).

History
The school began in 1914 as an adult education and training facility at Williamsport High School. It grew into the Williamsport Technical Institute in 1941. During World War II, the school operated 24 hours per day, providing war production training to help meet defense industry needs. Additionally, both during and after the war, the institute provided training and retraining for disabled veterans. In 1965, the Williamsport Area Community College (WACC) was founded, succeeding the former technical institute. It continued providing technical training for residents of northern Pennsylvania. In 1989, the college became a special mission affiliate of Pennsylvania State University and changed its name to Pennsylvania College of Technology.

Academics
Penn College offers more than 100 bachelor, associate, and certificate majors in careers ranging from manufacturing, design, transportation, and construction to hospitality, health, business, and natural resources. Additionally, the College offers a Master of Science in Physician Assistant Studies, and is launching a Master of Science in Nursing launching in Fall 2021. The College is a recognized leader in apprenticeship development through its Workforce Development department, co-administering an $8 million federal grant program to create industry-driven strategies for apprenticeships in advanced manufacturing fields and serving more than 3,200 apprentices in the process. The college is accredited by the Middle States Commission on Higher Education.

Schools
School of Business, Arts & Sciences 
School of Engineering Technologies
School of Nursing & Health Sciences

Rankings 
Penn College has been ranked highly from major academic accreditors, magazines and polls. In 2019 U.S. News & World Report ranked Penn College 12th best Regional College in Northeast Region, 3rd Most Innovative School and 6th as Best College for veterans.

Campuses
In addition to the main campus in Williamsport, Penn College operates four satellite campuses situated around the West Branch Susquehanna River and northern tier of Pennsylvania.

The Kathryn Wentzel Lumley Aviation Center, located approximately 7 miles east at the Williamsport Regional Airport in Montoursville, opened in 1993. It provides several FAA and Transport certified repair and maintenance programs.
The Herman T. Schneebeli Earth Science Center, located 10 miles south in Allenwood, offers programs such as landscape/horticulture, diesel & heavy equipment technology, heavy equipment operation, power generation, and forestry.
The Advanced Automotive Technology Center is located approximately three miles west of the Penn College main campus. Students at this campus study topics such as alternative-powered vehicles and motorsports.
Penn College at Wellsboro is located in North Central Pennsylvania in the Wellsboro Area School District Administration Building. It serves the Northern Tier (Pennsylvania) communities by providing business and industry training programs as well as noncredit personal and professional development.

In addition to other campus dining units, Penn College has a casual fine-dining restaurant named "Le Jeune Chef". The restaurant serves as a training facility for students in the School of Business, Arts & Sciences during service hours.

Student life

Demographics 
In fall 2019 Penn College posted ethnicity figures of 5,382 total students of which: 88.2% identified as White, 3.7% Hispanic/Latino, 3.3% Black or African American, 1.2% Asian, 0.2% American Indian or Alaska Native, 0.1% Native Hawaiian or Other Pacific Islander and 3.3% ethnicity unknown/ multiple. 64% of students are male, 34.4% of students are between 18 and 19 years of age, 29.2% are 20 to 21 and 36.4% are over age 21. Just below 90% of students hail from or are permanent residents of Pennsylvania. 27% of students live on campus and the remaining 73% commute or live off-campus. 6.7% or nearly 800 students are veterans, active duty or reserves.

Greek life and student organizations
Penn College currently recognizes two fraternities: Sigma Pi and Phi Mu Delta.

More than 60 student organizations are recognized at Penn College, many of which are student chapters of professional societies. Student Government Association serves as the students' democratic voice on campus. Wildcat Events Board works to bring many activities to the college.

On-campus housing
Penn College has three residence hall complexes, each comprising several buildings:
 Rose Street Commons
 Campus View Apartments
 The Village at Penn College

Student safety 

Penn College Police was formed the summer of 1994 prior to the 1994–95 school year. The police department carries out security and safety duties as well as investigative procedures for crimes committed on campus. With thousands of students, staff and college visitors on a given school day on campus they have 15 full-time officers, 4 property protection officers and 8 security guards. They operate a fleet of Ford Police Interceptor Utilitys, Ford Police Interceptor Sedans and Ford Crown Victoria Police Interceptors.

The Penn College Police Department responds to over 5,000 calls for service every year, mostly involving underage drinking on campus, property theft, drug possession and weapon possession.

Athletics
Penn College teams participate as a member of the National Collegiate Athletic Association's Division III. The Wildcats are a member of the North Eastern Athletic Conference (NEAC) as of the 2013–14 academic season. They are also members of the United States Collegiate Athletic Association (USCAA), the Penn State University Athletic Conference (PSUAC), U.S. Collegiate Archery (USCA), the National Collegiate Wrestling Association (NCWA) and the Mid Atlantic Men's Club Volleyball Conference (MACVC). Men's sports include archery, baseball, basketball, cross country, golf, lacrosse, soccer, tennis and wrestling. Women's sports include archery, basketball, cross country, soccer, softball, tennis and volleyball. The college also sponsors club sports including bowling, dancing, martial arts, men's volleyball and powerlifting.

Significant athletic achievements
Baseball: 2015 NEAC champions. The program has had 10 conference championships and nine All-Americans.
Golf: sixth at NEAC championship and 10th at 2015 USCAA national tournament. Two golfers won All-NEAC honors.
Five consecutive PSUAC Chancellor's Cups (2009–2013).
130 All-American selections.
23 PSUAC Championships since 2005.
Archery: finished third overall (2015 U.S. Outdoor Collegiate National Championships) with three individual first-place finishes. The program has had 76 All-Americans.

Notable alumni and faculty 
Alumni
Jake Corman, Pennsylvania State Senator (R-PA, 34th senatorial district).
Gary Haluska, PA Representative (D-PA, 73rd district)
Tom Marino, U.S. Representative (R-PA, 10th district)
Scott Wagner, former Pennsylvania State Senator (R-PA, 28th district), Republican nominee for Governor of Pennsylvania in 2018 election.
Faculty
Derek Slaughter, politician

References

External links

Pennsylvania State University colleges
1914 establishments in Pennsylvania
Universities and colleges in Lycoming County, Pennsylvania
USCAA member institutions
Buildings and structures in Williamsport, Pennsylvania
United East Conference schools
Williamsport